Peel Hall is a suburb of Manchester, England, nine miles south of the city centre and a mile north of Manchester Airport. Peel Hall is on the eastern edge of Wythenshawe and borders Heald Green and Gatley in the Metropolitan Borough of Stockport.

The area comprises both social and private housing, most of which was built in the 1950s and 1960s.

Peel Hall, an Elizabethan moated manor house just off Peel Hall Road at the junction of Lomond Road, belonged to the Egertons of Wythenshawe Hall. It fell into disrepair in the 1960s and was demolished. The moat survives, surrounded by a park which has recreation facilities and a children's playground. The moat was not defensive but, similar to the one at Little Morton Hall in Cheshire, an Elizabethan feature to keep out animals.

Areas of Manchester
Wythenshawe
British country houses destroyed in the 20th century